Waldgeist (German) – Forest spirit
 Wana-games-ak (Abenaki) – Water spirits
 Wani (Japanese) – Crocodilian water monster
 Wanyūdō (Japanese) – Demon in the form of a burning human-headed ox cart
 Warak ngendog (Indonesian Muslim) – Egg-laying bird
 Warg (English and Scandinavian O.N. vargr) – Giant, demonic wolf
 Warlock (Worldwide) – Male witch
 Wassan-mon-ganeehla-ak (Abenaki) – Aurora spirits
 Water monkey (Chinese) – Water spirit
 Water sprite (Alchemy) – Water elemental
 Wati-kutjara (Australia Aboriginal) – Goanna spirits
 Wa-won-dee-a-megw (Abenaki) – Shapeshifting snail spirit
 Weiße Frauen (German) – Female spirit
 Wekufe (Mapuche) – Demon
 Wendigo (Algonquian) – Anthropophagous spirit
 Wentshukumishiteu (Inuit) – Water spirit
 Werecat (Worldwide) – Feline-human shapeshifter
 Werehyena (Africa) – Hyena-human shapeshifter
 Werewolf (Worldwide) – Wolf-human shapeshifter
 White Lady (Worldwide) – Ghost of a murdered or mistreated woman
 Whowie (Australian Aboriginal) – Giant frog-headed goanna with six legs
 Wild man (European) – Hairy, bipedal, man-like creature
 Will-o'-the-Wisp (Worldwide) – Spectral fire
 Winged genie (Assyrian)  – Bearded male figures sporting birds
 Wirry-cow (Scottish) – Malevolent spirit
 Witch (Worldwide) – Person who practices magic
 Witte Wieven (Dutch) – Female, ancestral spirit
 Wolpertinger (German) – Forest animal comprised from various animal parts (similar to a Chimera)
 Wondjina (Australia Aboriginal) – Weather spirit
 Wraith (Scottish) – Water spirit or ghostly apparition
 Wulver (Scottish) – Wolf-headed humanoid spirit
 Wu Tou Gui (Chinese) – Beheaded ghost
 Wyrm – English dragon
 Wyvern (Germanic Heraldic) – Flying reptile, usually with two legs and two wings

w